Oenopota valentina is a species of sea snail, a marine gastropod mollusk in the family Mangeliidae.

Description

Distribution
This marine species occurs off the Kurile Islands, Russia

References

 Golikov, A. N. & V. V. Gulbin. 1977. Prosobranchial gastropods of the Kurile Islands. II. Orders Hamiglossa—Homeostropha. pp. 172–268. In: Coast waters of the Kurile Islands. Moscow Science Publishers: Moscow,

External links
 
 

valentina
Gastropods described in 1977